Alessandro Beti Rosa, better known as Magrão (born April 9, 1977), is a former brazilian football goalkeeper, who played for Sport Recife for 14 years. He is well known as the club most important player in history, and also by being a penalty defender. He has defended 28 penalties so far since 2005.

Club statistics

Honours
Sport Recife
Campeonato Pernambucano: 2006, 2007, 2008, 2009, 2010, 2014, 2017, 2019
Copa do Brasil: 2008
Copa do Nordeste: 2014

Current contract
Contract until dec/2019. Contract broke in July 2019.

References

External links
 
 CBF 
 

1977 births
Living people
Footballers from São Paulo
Brazilian footballers
Nacional Atlético Clube (SP) players
Botafogo Futebol Clube (SP) players
Associação Portuguesa de Desportos players
Ceará Sporting Club players
Fortaleza Esporte Clube players
Rio Branco Esporte Clube players
Sport Club do Recife players
Association football goalkeepers
Campeonato Brasileiro Série A players
Campeonato Brasileiro Série B players